The Vultee V-11 and V-12 were American stressed-skin monocoque monoplane attack aircraft of the 1930s. Developed from the Vultee V-1 single-engined airliner, the V-11 and V-12 were purchased by several nations for their armed forces, including China, who used them in combat against Japanese forces in the Second Sino-Japanese War. The United States Army Air Corps purchased seven V-11s as the YA-19 in the years before World War II, testing them to gather data to compare against twin engine light attack aircraft.

Design and development
In 1935, Vultee produced a light bomber derivative of their single-engined passenger transport, the Vultee V-1, which, while demonstrating good performance, was only sold in small numbers owing to restrictions placed on the use of single-engined aircraft for scheduled passenger transport operations.

The resulting aircraft, the Vultee V-11, retained the single-engined, low wing format and all-metal stressed skin structure of the V-1. It combined a new fuselage with accommodation for the three crew members under a long greenhouse canopy with the wings and tail surfaces of the Vultee V-1.

Operational history

China

An initial order for 30 two-seat V-11Gs was placed by China before the end of 1935. This was followed by orders in 1939, for two versions (the V-12-C and V-12D) of the more powerful V-12 variant. The majority of these were planned to be assembled from kits at the Central Aircraft Manufacturing Company factory at Loiwing near the China-Burma border, and while the first batch of 25 V-12-Cs were completed successfully, the factory was heavily bombed just after assembly of the first V-12-Ds commenced. This resulted in the part built airframes being evacuated to India, where it was planned that the aircraft be completed at the Hindustan Aircraft Limited factory in Bangalore. However, after a few were assembled, production was stopped as the factory was diverted to more urgent overhaul work.

The V-11s and V-12s were used as light bombers and achieved some success, including a mission to bomb the Japanese held airfield by 4 aircraft at Yuncheng on February 5, 1939, by the 10th Squadron of the Republic of China Air Force, before the aircraft were withdrawn from bombing missions to training and liaison duties in 1940.

Brazil

In February 1939, the Brazilian Army Air Corps acquired the first 10 Vultee V-11–GB2s for long range bombing. 26 aircraft were eventually used by the Brazilian Air Force.

A  non-stop flight was made across the Brazilian hinterland in 11 hours and 45 min on 8 November 1939 using a V-11.

On 26 August 1942, a U-boat was attacked 50 miles off the town of Ararangua off the southern coast of Brazil. Despite the unsuitability for anti submarine operations, the aircraft flew low and dropped its load of three  bombs, some of which exploded around the submarine, however the blast damaged the low flying aircraft.

Soviet Union

In 1936, the Soviet Union purchased four three-seat V-11-GB aircraft, together with a production license. The aircraft entered Soviet production in 1937 as the BSh-1 (Bronirovanny Shturmovik), but the armour fitted for the ground attack role unacceptably reduced performance and production was stopped after 31 aircraft. They were transferred to Aeroflot and redesignated PS-43 for use as high speed transports until the German invasion in 1941, when they were returned to the Air Force for liaison purposes.

United States

In the late 1930s, the United States Army Air Corps favored twin-engine light attack aircraft but seven YA-19 aircraft were ordered in the summer of 1938 for comparison purposes. The YA-19s were armed with six  machine guns and  bombs in an internal bomb bay, powered by a  Twin Wasp radial engine and was manned by a crew of three including a pilot, observer/gunner, and bombardier/photographer.

An unusual feature of the YA-19 design was its horizontal stabiliser which was located forward of the vertical tail. The small size of the vertical stabilizer caused yaw instability so the last YA-19 (S/N 38-555) was equipped with enlarged vertical stabilizer.

Service tests showed that twin-engine attack aircraft were faster, could be better armed and carried a larger bomb load so no further YA-19s were ordered. After comparison tests five YA-19s were redesignated A-19 and assigned to the 17th Attack Group at March Field in California for a brief period before being transferred to the Panama Canal Zone for utility transport and liaison duties. The A-19 never saw combat and was quickly withdrawn in the early 1940s.

Variants

Vultee Designations
V-11
First prototype fitted with  Wright SR-1820-F53 Cyclone driving a two-bladed Hamilton Standard controllable-pitch propeller, which crashed killing both pilot and the project engineer.
V-11-A
Second prototype, similar to first V-11, but with a three-bladed constant speed propeller.

V-11-G
Initial production two-seat light bomber. Powered by an  Wright R-1820-G2 Cyclone engine. 30 built for China.
V-11-GB
Three-seat version of V-11. 4 aircraft purchased by Soviet Union (2 as pattern aircraft), 40 by Turkey and others.
V-11-GB2
26 purchased by Brazil – generally similar to V-11-GB
V11-GB2F
Final example for Brazil fitted with floats, however it wasn't accepted.
V-11-GBT
redesignation of V-11-GB for Turkey
V-12
Revised version of three-seat bomber with refined aerodynamics and more power. One prototype flew in 1939 powered by Pratt & Whitney R-1830 Twin Wasp engine.
V-12-C
Production version of V-12 for China. Powered by R1820-G105B Cyclone engine. 26 built, one by Vultee and remaining 25 assembled in China.
V-12-D
Revised version with new fuselage and powered by  Wright R-2600 Cyclone 14 engine. 52 ordered for China, two pattern aircraft built by Vultee and 50 for local assembly.
V-52
Unbuilt observation design based on YA-19.

USAAC Designations

YA-19
Variant of V-11-GB for United states Army Air Corps. Seven examples built.
YA-19A
The last YA-19 was redesignated and completed as an engine test bed. Equipped with enlarged vertical stabilizer (for improve directional stability) and powered by Lycoming O-1230 (12-cylinder opposed) engine.
YA-19B
The second YA-19 built was redesignated after being fitted with a Pratt & Whitney R-2800 radial engine as an engine test bed.
YA-19C
The YA-19A was redesignated after being fitted with a Pratt & Whitney Twin Wasp R-1830-51 engine. Performance was similar to the YA-19.
A-19
The remaining five YA-19s were redesignated A-19 after assignment to active duty.

Soviet Designations
BSh-1
Soviet licensed armoured ground attack version. Powered by  M-62. Production stopped after at least 31 built.
PS-43
Designation for BSh-1 when used by Aeroflot as light transport.

Operators

 Brazilian Army Aviation – Vultee V-11-GB2 (25 delivered)
 Brazilian Air Force - aircraft transferred when Air Force created

 Republic of China Air Force
14th Squadron – Vultee V-11G (30), V-12C (25 delivered from order of 26, which was built but never delivered) & Vultee V-12D (52 delivered)

 Soviet Air Forces – Vultee V-11GB (4 delivered) & BSh-1 (31-35 built at Moscow Menzhinskii factory)

 Turkish Air Force
2nd Regiment – Vultee V-11GB (41 delivered)

 United States Army Air Corps – A-19/V-11GB (7 delivered)

Specifications (Vultee XA-19)

See also

References

Notes

Citations

Bibliography
 

 
 
 
 
 
 

A-19
World War II ground attack aircraft of the United States
A-19
Single-engined tractor aircraft
Low-wing aircraft
Aircraft first flown in 1935